California Breed is the only studio album by English-American hard rock band California Breed. Produced by Dave Cobb, the album was released in May 2014 through Frontiers Records.

Background
California Breed was formed in 2013 by Glenn Hughes, Jason Bonham (both having recently been part of Black Country Communion), and Andrew Watt; Hughes and Watt initially began writing together after meeting, with Bonham finalising the trio's lineup shortly after. The group recorded its debut album throughout late 2013, an album which was recorded live-to-tape in the studio, and the formation of the band was formally announced the following year.

Track listing

Personnel

California Breed
Glenn Hughes – vocals, bass
Andrew Watt – guitar, vocals
Jason Bonham – drums
Additional musicians
Dave Cobb – production, percussion
Mike Webb – keyboards
Kristen Rogers – backing vocals
Julian Lennon – additional vocals on "Breathe"

Production personnel
Mark Petaccia – engineering
Vance Powell – mixing
Eddie Spear – mixing assistance
Pete Lyman – mastering
Tim Ellis – Additional audio engineering on "Breathe"
Graphics personnel
Austyn Weiner – art direction, photography
The Charles – graphic design

Chart positions

Release history

References

2014 debut albums
California Breed albums
Frontiers Records albums
Albums produced by Dave Cobb